This page covers all the important events in the sport of tennis in 2022. It provides the results of notable tournaments throughout the year on both the ATP and WTA Tours, the Davis Cup, and the Fed Cup.

News 
Rafael Nadal won his second Australian Open title and record-breaking 21st major title overall (breaking a tie he held with Novak Djokovic and Roger Federer), defeating Daniil Medvedev in the final.

Nadal began 2022 with a 22-match win streak which ended with his loss in the finals of the 2022 BNP Paribas Open to Taylor Fritz.

Djokovic, who is unvaccinated, did not play the Australian Open or tournaments in the United States because of vaccination requirements. Djokovic traveled to Australia believing he'd be able to play with a medical exemption but after a short detainment by the Australian Border Force, was deported from the country by Alex Hawke, the Minister for Immigration, Citizenship, Migrant Services and Multicultural Affairs. In an interview with BBC News' Amol Rajan, Djokovic said missing tournaments because of his vaccination status was "the price that I'm willing to pay".

2022 saw a rise in violent incidents with players like Alexander Zverev, Nick Kyrgios, and Jenson Brooksby throwing rackets and either hitting or nearly hitting officials or ball kids. Former players including Andy Roddick and Patrick McEnroe expressed their anger on Twitter that players weren't being punished. McEnroe wrote: "Seriously what is it going to take …drawing blood …to properly punish a tennis player. This is absolutely absurd."

Three-time grand slam champion Ashleigh Barty retired at 25 years old and was removed from the rankings making Iga Świątek the first Polish world No. 1.

2021 US Open champion Daniil Medvedev claimed the No. 1 ranking following many of Djokovic's absences. This ended Djokovic's record 361 weeks as No. 1 and made Medvedev the first player outside of The Big Four to be No. 1 since Andy Roddick in 2004. Djokovic regained his No. 1 position after Medvedev was defeated at the 2022 BNP Paribas Open.

As part of international sports' reaction to the Russian invasion of Ukraine, the WTA, the ATP, the ITF, and the four Grand Slam tournaments jointly announced that players from Belarus and Russia would not be allowed to play under the names or flags of their countries, but would remain eligible to play events until further notice. Certain Russian and Belarusian players such as Medvedev, Anastasia Pavlyuchenkova, and Andrey Rublev spoke out against the war. After winning his semifinal match at the 2022 Dubai Tennis Championships, Rublev wrote "No war please" on a camera lens, a few days into the invasion. Belarusian and former No. 1, Victoria Azarenka was seen visibly crying during her third round loss at the 2022 BNP Paribas Open, and a few weeks later, stormed out of her match for good at the third round of the 2022 Miami Open against Linda Fruhvirtová. In a statement following her retirement, Azarenka said that her personal life had been "extremely stressful" and that she "shouldn't have gone on the court today". She deleted her social media accounts and said that she planned to take a break from the tour.

Twenty-three-time Grand Slam champion and 5 time Olympic gold medalist Serena Williams made her return to the  2022 WTA Tour after sustaining a hamstring injury in the first round of the 2021 Wimbledon Championships. Accepting a wildcard into the women's draw of the 2022 Wimbledon Championships, Williams lost in the first round to Harmony Tan. This was only the second time in her career that she lost in the first round of a Grand Slam tournament. Following her Wimbledon loss, she returned for the US Open Series, where she beat Nuria Párrizas Díaz in straight sets at the 2022 National Bank Open. The following day, in an essay in Vogue, Williams announced she would be "evolving away" from tennis, signaling the end of her career after the 2022 US Open. The next day, she lost in the second round to Belinda Bencic. At the 2022 Cincinnati Masters, Williams lost to reigning US Open champion, Emma Raducanu. Prior to the US Open, Williams announced she would be playing doubles with her sister, Venus Williams. At her first round match at the 2022 US Open against Danka Kovinic, Williams won in straight sets. She then drew world no. 2 Anett Kontaveit, who she beat in three sets. With her win against Kontaveit, Williams became the oldest women to defeat a top 3 player. The following night, Serena and Venus' doubles match was the first opening round doubles match to be televised in primetime. In her third round match against Ajla Tomljanović, Williams lost in three sets, despite commanding an early lead. With this loss, Williams' confirmed her retirement after 27 years on the professional tour. Serena Williams is considered by many to be the greatest women's tennis player of all time.

Furthermore, twenty-time Grand Slam champion Roger Federer announced his retirement at the end of 2022 Laver Cup after numerous injury setbacks at the end of the 2021 Wimbledon Championships.

ITF

Grand Slam events

ATP/WTA

ATP Masters 1000/WTA 1000

References

External links 
 Official website of the Association of Tennis Professionals (ATP)
 Official website of the Women's Tennis Association (WTA)
 Official website of the International Tennis Federation (ITF)
 Official website of the International Team Competition in Men's Tennis (Davis Cup)
 Official website of the International Team Competition in Women's Tennis (Fed Cup)

Tennis by year